Lech Felicjan Boguszewicz (27 August 1938 – 9 August 2010) was a Polish long-distance runner. He competed in the men's 5000 metres at the 1964 Summer Olympics.

References

1938 births
2010 deaths
Athletes (track and field) at the 1964 Summer Olympics
Polish male long-distance runners
Olympic athletes of Poland
Sportspeople from Vilnius